Urucaua River is a river in the state of Amapá in north-eastern Brazil. The area around the Urucaua River is the ancestral territory of the Palikur. The village of Kumenê is located on the Urucaua River.

See also
List of rivers of Amapá

References

 Brazilian Ministry of Transport

Rivers of Amapá